High-Flyer is a Hangzhou-based hedge fund and artificial intelligence (AI) company founded in 2015. It is one of the largest quantitative funds in China.

History 

High-Flyer was founded in 2015 by three engineers from Zhejiang University. They generated ideas of algorithmic trading as students during the 2007–2008 financial crisis. The company has two AMAC regulated subsidiaries, Zhejiang High-Flyer Asset Management Co.,Ltd. and Ningbo High-Flyer Quant Investment Management Partnership LLP which were established in 2015 and 2016 respectively. The two subsidiaries have over 450 investment products.

In 2016 the firm experimented with a deep learning algorithmic model to take stock positions and began testing in trading the following year.

In 2019, the company established High-Flyer AI which was dedicated to research on AI algorithms and its basic applications. In the same year the company set up a SFC regulated subsidiary in Hong Kong named High-Flyer Capital Management (Hong Kong) Limited. It was approved as a Qualified Foreign Institutional Investor one year later.

In 2020, the company established Fire-Flyer I, a supercomputer that focuses on AI deep learning. It cost approximately 200 million Yuan.

In 2021, Fire-Flyer I was retired and was replaced by Fire-Flyer II which cost 1 billion Yuan.

At the end of 2021, High-Flyer put out a public statement on WeChat apologizing for its losses in assets due to poor performance. The performance of over 100 of its investment products declined by over 10%. High-Flyer stated that its AI models did not time trades well although its stock selection was fine in terms of long-term value. The models would take on higher risk during marker fluctuations which deepened the decline. In addition the company stated it had expanded its assets too quickly leading to similar trading strategies that made operations more difficult. Up until this point, High-Flyer produced returns that were 20%-50% more than stock-market benchmarks in the past few years. Higher

In 2022, the company donated 221 million Yuan to charity as the Chinese government pushed firms to do more in the same of "common prosperity".

In March 2023, it was reported that High-Flyer was being sued by Shanghai Ruitian Investment LLC for hiring one of its employees. The rival firm stated the former employee possessed quantitative strategy codes that are considered "core commercial secrets" and sought 5 million Yuan in compensation for anti-competitive practices.

Background 

High-Flyer's investment and research team had 160 members as of 2021 which include Olympiad Gold medalists internet giant expects and senior researchers.  It has been trying to recruit deep learning scientists by offering annual salaries of up to 2 million Yuan.

See also 

 Hedge fund industry in China

References

External links
 
 

Chinese companies established in 2015
Companies based in Hangzhou
Financial services companies established in 2015
Hedge funds
Investment management companies of China
Technology companies established in 2015